Seán Carroll (20 January 1892 – 1 February 1954) was an Irish politician. He was first elected to Dáil Éireann as a Sinn Féin Teachta Dála (TD) for the Limerick constituency at the 1923 general election.  He did not take his seat in the Dáil due to Sinn Féin's abstentionist policy.

He did not contest the June 1927 general election. He stood as a Clann na Poblachta candidate at the 1948 general election for the Limerick East constituency but was not elected.

References

1892 births
1954 deaths
Early Sinn Féin TDs
Clann na Poblachta politicians
Members of the 4th Dáil
Politicians from County Limerick